Atractus erythromelas, the red-black ground snake,  is a species of snake in the family Colubridae. The species can be found in Venezuela and Colombia.

References 

Atractus
Reptiles of Venezuela
Reptiles of Colombia
Reptiles described in 1903
Taxa named by George Albert Boulenger